Paweł Skórzewski (Ogończyk coat of arms) (born July 29, 1744 in Mączniki - died in 1819) was Polish Brigadier General of the Duchy of Warsaw, a member of the Bar Confederation, a delegate to the Polish Sejm, senator of the Kingdom of Poland and wojewoda of Kalisz.

References

Polish soldiers
1819 deaths
1744 births
Polish commanders of the Napoleonic Wars